Diane Bayegla Ndeme (born 9 June 1990) is a Cameroonian football player. She played at the 2018 Africa Women Cup of Nations, winning a bronze medal,

She played for Caïman Douala.

References

External links 
 D. NDEME, soccerway

1990 births
Cameroonian women's footballers
Living people
Women's association footballers not categorized by position
21st-century Cameroonian women
20th-century Cameroonian women